United States v. Clintwood Elkhorn Mining Company, 553 U.S. 1 (2008), is a United States Supreme Court case that concerns refunds for a tax that was levied and subsequently found to be unconstitutional. The Court held that a person claiming a refund for an unconstitutional tax must go through the normal administrative procedures for tax refunds before filing a lawsuit against the government.

See also
 List of United States Supreme Court cases
 Lists of United States Supreme Court cases by volume
 List of United States Supreme Court cases by the Roberts Court

References

External links
 

United States Supreme Court cases
United States Supreme Court cases of the Roberts Court
United States taxation and revenue case law
2008 in United States case law